The Bertram Bridge, also known as the Ely Street Bridge, was a historic structure located near the town of Bertram in rural Linn County, Iowa, United States. The metal 5-panel pinned Pratt through truss bridge was built in 1891. It was designed by the J.E. Jayne and Son Bridge Company of Iowa City. The bridge had two main spans and two approach spans. The bridge was listed on the National Register of Historic Places in 1998 as a part of the Highway Bridges of Iowa MPS.

Bertram Bridge was destroyed by flood waters from Big Creek on June 29, 2014, and was removed from the National Register later that year.

References

Bridges completed in 1891
National Register of Historic Places in Linn County, Iowa
Road bridges on the National Register of Historic Places in Iowa
Former National Register of Historic Places in Iowa
Truss bridges in Iowa
Bridges in Linn County, Iowa
1891 establishments in Iowa
Metal bridges in the United States
Buildings and structures destroyed by flooding